"Walked Outta Heaven" is the second single released by R&B group Jagged Edge from their fourth studio album Hard.

The single peaked at number six on the Billboard Hot 100 in December 2003, making it the group's second best performing single on that chart. It also peaked at number 21 on the UK Singles Chart.

Remix
The official remix features rapper Scarface. The remix's instrumental sampled "Be Real Black for Me" by Roberta Flack & Donny Hathaway.

Track listing
 "Walked Outta Heaven"
 "Girls Gone Wild"

Charts

Weekly charts

Year-end charts

References

2003 singles
2004 singles
2003 songs
Jagged Edge (American group) songs
Song recordings produced by Jermaine Dupri
Songs written by Bryan-Michael Cox
So So Def Recordings singles